Syed Rasel (born 3 July 1984) is a Bangladeshi cricketer, who plays all formats of the game. He is a left-handed medium-fast swing bowler who came up through the ranks of the under-19s, to the Bangladesh A team, to the full Bangladesh team, while playing for Khulna Division.

Playing for Bangladesh A against Kent in August 2005, a 21-year-old Rasel took 7 for 50 in the first innings and finished the match with ten wickets.

International career
He was rewarded with a spot in the Bangladeshi squad for the tour of Sri Lanka the following month. He went on to make both his Test and ODI debuts on the island. Figures of 4 for 129 came in the second Test at Colombo.

Back home at Bogra in February 2006, Rasel took 2 for 28 to give Bangladesh their first ever ODI win over Sri Lanka.

Rasel's progress was halted when he damaged his foot in a motorbike accident but he recovered in time to take part in the 2006 Champions Trophy.

Despite not playing all but one game of their last ODI series before 2007 Cricket World Cup, he made the squad for the Caribbean. In the 3rd Test against Sri Lanka during the 2007 season he became the 700th Test victim of Muttiah Muralitharan.

At the start of November 2010, the BCB announced 16 central contracts. Rasel was one of six players in the third tier (grade B). He recently signed for Halstead Cricket Club. When the central contracts were next renewed, in April 2012, Rasel's contract was allowed to lapse.

References

External links
 

1984 births
Living people
Bangladeshi cricketers
21st-century Bangladeshi cricketers
Bangladesh Test cricketers
Bangladesh One Day International cricketers
Bangladesh Twenty20 International cricketers
Khulna Division cricketers
Rajshahi Royals cricketers
People from Jessore District
Barisal Division cricketers
Bangladesh under-23 cricketers